Eustorgius I was bishop of Milan from 343 to about 349. He is honoured as a Saint in both the Catholic Church and the Eastern Orthodox Church. His feast day is on the September 18.

Life
According to the tradition, Eustorgius was a noble Greek. He was the legate of Milan and he was elected as bishop at the death of Protasius in 343. Eustorgius traveled to Constantinople to have his election as bishop confirmed by the Emperor, and in that occasion Emperor donated to him the relics of the Three Magi which he translated from Constantinople to Milan.

From 345 to 346 and from 347 to 348, he held two synods.  He also began construction of churches and basilicas in Milan.  Saint Athanasius called him a "defender of the faith" and mentions him as an opponent of Arianism.  Saint Ambrose called him by the honorable title of "confessor", and just in such a way some verses concerning Milan in ca. 700. His name was included in the Ambrosian Rite and his cult in Milan is testified by the presence of five churches dedicated to him (as testified in a 14th-century document, Liber notitiae sanctorum Mediolani ), the best known of which is the Basilica of Sant'Eustorgio. A 5th or 6th century song indicates that he was a famous holy man and that he had built a great sarcophagus. And two little  cows had transported the large shrine. Eustorgius was perhaps buried in the cemetery on the grounds of Sant'Eustorgio, which was located outside the Roman walls along the road to Pavia., and then in his church which was dedicated by him. His relics are in the main altar. For September 18, the Roman Martyrology states: "At Milan, St. Eustorgius I, Bishop of that city, rendered by the testimony of blessed Ambrose."

Legend

His legendary Vita dates from the 12th century and exists in 20 different documents. His legend states that in 344, he brought the relics of the Three Magi from Constantinople to Milan, with two small cows which transported a large sarcophagus of marble. (Photo: Empty shrine in St. Eustorgio, ca. 300 AD)

The relics of the Magi - Stefan Lochner paints a picture in 1445 - were taken from Milan by Holy Roman Emperor Fredrick Barbarossa and given to the Archbishop of Cologne, Rainald of Dassel, in 1164.  A Shrine of the Three Kings at Cologne Cathedral still exists (a part of these relics were returned to the Basilica of Sant'Eustorgio of Milan in 1904)

"In the days of Philipp of Heinsberg, who followed Reinaldus, the shrine of the three magi was built. This was told to me by some eyewitnesses who were present when the three magi were put into the shrine." (Vita Eustorgii))

The Vita Beati Eustorgii Confessoris reports around the year 1200:

"... The holy Helena, mother of the emperor Constantine, was one with all virtues affected and a very much pious woman regarding the Christian religion. Therefore, she proved uncommon eagerness in collecting relics of the holy ones. She traveled in own person through those widen countries of the Roman realm to the Orient and to the Western World. There she built over the bodies of the martyrs, who were killed by cruelty of tyrants because their Christian names, substantial memorials. Apart from the many fameful proofs of her piety to God she also accumulated the bodies of the Three Magi together, who were buried in different places, and Helena brought the bodies towards Constantinople. In this city they remained in large honours until the times of the emperor Manuel. At that time Eustorgius lived, Greek birth, a very informed man, nobly and piously, of pleasing exterior, eloquently, for the service to God quite
been suitable and in this service turned, a guard of the faith, and also  chaste, and a native from Constantinople, before the times of bishop Saint Ambrose of Milan. He came as an ambassador of the
emperor Manuel to Milan, and the people of Milan selected him to bishop. Therefore, Eustorgius returned to Constantinople, said thanks to the emperor and spoke: My father and emperor Manuel, I thanks you that you have appreciated the honour towards me up to now and that you have sent me into the holy city Milan, your metropolis. You should know that I have achieved everything, faithfully and after your will, the deliveries are always secured for you, but I am however the chosen one of the city, because you, in honour of God and to praise his charitableness. I unworthy one was urgent asked to return and to announce, what in the view
on our God and on you  your you faithfully resulted people have done at me and like the people delegated these envoys with me to you. Intend
mine and instruct, what I am to do. The emperor answered: Become bishop, worthy man. Eustorgius answers: I thank God and you; but allow, dearest gentleman, that I can carry forward and can take away to the holy city of Milan anything of the sanctuaries, which me liked, if God's benignity permits it, in order to honour the church with holy relics, and as a gratification for your tributary people. The emperor answers: Select, receive, carry forward, which you would like. Be as if you are, or, is it possible, become still better. Greet my people and announce that from now on the whole delivery is issued. Thus Eustorgius went pleased, and he manufactured a marmorean coffin with large effort, and put into it the bodies of the Three Kings, who had brought Christus their gifts - gold, frankincense and myrrh. With trouble under many nights in which he was awake, and through God's assistance and amicability he transported it towards Milan into the city. The sarcophagus became buried outside of the city-wall closely beside the city in a church, which later was sanctified to honor holy Eustorgius. Also there is a famous and very holy source, where the neophytes had received the holy baptism, all Christians pious veneration with dignity. ..."

Notes

External links

 Ekkart Sauser (2000). Bautz, Traugott. ed. Eustorgios I.: heiliger Bischof von Mailand. Biographisch-Bibliographisches Kirchenlexikon (BBKL). 17. Herzberg. col. 356. 
 Santi e beati: Sant' Eustorgio I di Milano
 Very old stone-relief in St. Eustorgio: Bishop Eustorgius I brings relics of the Three Magi. He is behind the shrine and not to be seen in this photo. 
 Eustorgius I, informations concerning the relics of the three kings

Bishops of Milan
350s deaths
4th-century Christian saints
4th-century Greek people
Saints from Roman Italy
Year of birth unknown
Legendary Greek people